Gilbert Vaughn Hemsley Jr. (1936–1983) was a noted United States lighting designer and teacher of lighting design.

Biography
He was born in Bridgeport, Connecticut.

Hemsley studied history at Yale, earned an MFA at Yale Drama School in 1960, and worked as assistant to lighting designer Jean Rosenthal.

He was production manager for the inaugurations of U.S. Presidents Richard Nixon and Jimmy Carter, but he is best known for his work as a lighting designer on Broadway, at numerous regional theatres, and as the lighting director at the New York City Opera. Hemsley taught lighting design at the University of Wisconsin–Madison and was celebrated there for his generosity with students, many of whom served as assistants at New York City Opera and elsewhere.

He died in 1983.

Legacy
A 150-seat black box theatre on the UW campus is named for him. A notable attendee of his memorial service in New York City was Beverly Sills, who announced the establishment in Hemsley's name of apprenticeship funds at New York City Opera and at Wisconsin.

References

External links

Gilbert Helmsley Papers at the Wisconsin Center for Film and Theater Research
The Gilbert V. Hemsley, Jr. Internship in Lighting
Larry Wild, Northern State University, A Brief Outline of the History of Stage Lighting

1936 births
1983 deaths
American lighting designers
Yale School of Drama alumni
Artists from Bridgeport, Connecticut